Maolmhuaidh is an Irish surname, generally anglicised as Molloy or Mulloy. Like other Irish surnames, Maolmhuaidh is patronymic. The male version is Ó Maolmhuaidh ("ó" meaning "son of"); the female versions are Uí Mhaolmhuaidh ("uí" meaning "wife of") and Ní Mhaolmhuaidh ("ní" meaning "daughter of"); the family or house name is Uí Mhaolmhuaidh.

Ó Maolmhuaidh Fir Cell

The Uí Maolmhuaidh of Fir Cell (men of the churches, in what is now County Offaly) claimed descent from the southern Uí Néill. The 16th-century mercenary, Captain Greene O'Mulloy, was of this family.

Ó Maoil Aodha Oirthir Connachta

The Uí Maoil Aodha ("descendant of the devotee of (St.) Aodh") family lived in east Connacht, and is now found as both Mullee and Molloy.

Ó Maolmhaodhóg Tir Connall

The Uí Maolmhaodhóg ("descendant of the devotee of (St.) Maodhóg") surname is now usually rendered as Mulvogue, or Logue, but sometimes Molloy, particularly around the Glenties area of County Donegal.

Instances

The 1890 registration of births found bearers of the surname concentrated in counties Donegal, Dublin, Galway, and Mayo.

Notables of the name

 Ailbe Ua Maíl Mhuaidh (died 1223), bishop of Ferns
 Froinsias Ó Maolmhuaidh (c.1606-77), Franciscan friar, theologian and grammarian
 James Lynam Molloy (1837-1909), songwriter
 William Theodore Mulloy (1892–1959), bishop of Covington 
 Gardnar Mulloy (born 1913), former tennis player
 M.J. Molloy (1917-1994), farmer and playwright
 William Mulloy (1917–1978), American anthropologist.
 Sheila Mulloy, writer and historian. 
 James T. Molloy (1936–2011) Doorkeeper of the House of Representatives 
 Bobby Molloy (born 1936), retired TD 
 Phil Mulloy (born 1948), British animator. 
 The Mulloy Brothers, traditional Irish ballad group
 Daniel Mulloy (born 1977), British artist and filmmaker
 Lucy Mulloy (born 1979), screenwriter and film director
 Aaron Molloy (born 1997), professional football player

External links
  http://www.irishtimes.com/ancestor/surname/index.cfm?fuseaction=Go.&UserID=

Surnames
Irish-language surnames
Irish families
Surnames of Irish origin